Bence Lenzsér (born April 9, 1996) is a Hungarian footballer. He currently plays for Paksi FC.
He was also part of the Hungarian U-19 at the 2014 UEFA European Under-19 Championship and  U-20 team at the 2015 FIFA U-20 World Cup.

Career statistics

Club

References

1996 births
Living people
Hungarian footballers
Hungary youth international footballers
Hungary under-21 international footballers
Nemzeti Bajnokság I players
Paksi FC players
Association football defenders
Sportspeople from Győr
21st-century Hungarian people